Symplocos trichoclada is a species of plant in the family Symplocaceae. It is endemic to Taiwan.

References

Endemic flora of Taiwan
trichoclada
Vulnerable plants
Taxonomy articles created by Polbot